The following is an incomplete list of association football clubs based in Rwanda.
For a complete list see :Category:Football clubs in Rwanda

A
Amagaju (Nyamagabe)
APR FC (Kigali)
AS Kigali (Kigali)
ATRACO FC

E
Electrogaz FC
Espérance F.C. (Kigali)
Espoir FC (Rusizi)
Etincelles FC (Rubavu)

G
Gicumbi F.C.

I
Isonga FC (Kigali)

L
La Jeunesse FC (Kigali)

M
Marines FC (Rubavu)
Muhanga FC (Muhanga)
Mukura Victory Sports FC (Huye)
Musanze FC

N
Nyanza F.C.

P
Panthères Noires
Police FC (Kigali)

R
Rayon Sport (Nyanza)

S
SC Kiyovu Sport (Kigali)

 
Rwanda
Football clubs
Football clubs